The Kirkuk–Ceyhan Oil Pipeline, also known as the Iraq–Turkey Crude Oil Pipeline, is a  pipeline that runs from Kirkuk in Iraq to Ceyhan in Turkey. It is Iraq's largest crude oil export line.

Technical description
Usable capacity of the line is believed to be only , with significant repairs still required.

Incidents of sabotage
The line's Iraqi part has been a principal sabotage target since 2003.  On 26 October 2009, the blast near Mosul halted oil supplies through the pipeline.
On 16 August 2013, at around 0100 GMT near the al-Shura area 60 km to the south of the city of Mosul a bomb attack damaged the pipeline. On 3 September 2013, at around 0200 GMT near Ein al-Jahash area, a bomb attack damaged the pipeline.

Kurdistan Pipeline
In 2013, the Kurdistan Regional Government of Iraq completed a pipeline from the Taq Taq field through Khurmala (the northwest sector dome of the greater Kirkuk field) and Dahuk to Pesh Khabur (Fesh Khabur) on the Turkey-Iraq border, where it is connected to the Kirkuk-Ceyhan pipeline. It allows the export of oil from the Taq Taq and Tawke oil fields. On 23 May 2014, the Kurdistan Regional Government announced that the first oil transported via the new pipeline was loaded into a tanker at Ceyhan.

New pipeline proposal
Iraq is considering building a new Kirkuk–Ceyhan pipeline to bypass attack-prone areas and double the export capacity.

See also

Kirkuk–Baniyas pipeline
Samsun–Ceyhan pipeline
Baku–Tbilisi–Ceyhan pipeline

References

Energy infrastructure completed in 1970
Oil pipelines in Iraq
Oil pipelines in Turkey
Kirkuk
Ceyhan
Iraq–Turkey relations
Economy of Kurdistan Region (Iraq)